''This is a list of Panjabi films of the 1970s. For a complete alphabetical list, see Punjabi films.

1970
 List of Punjabi films of 1970

1972
 List of Punjabi films of 1972

1973
 List of Punjabi films of 1973

1974
 List of Punjabi films of 1974

1975
 List of Punjabi films of 1975

1976
 List of Punjabi films of 1976

1977
 List of Punjabi films of 1977

1970s
Punjabi